The American Indoor Football Alliance (AIFA) is a minor-professional American indoor football league based in the United States.

Teams' typical operating budget is $500,000 with a $90,000 payroll budget per season. Players are paid up to $200 per game, with a $25 bonus for participating in charity events within their local communities. Most teams offer players housing during the season.

AIFA has a inter-league scheduling agreement with the American West Football Conference.

History 
After the 2021 American Arena League season concluded, four members of the East Division (Carolina Predators, Tampa Bay Tornadoes, Pennsylvania Union and Mississippi Raiders) announced that they would leave the AAL to form new league, after league president and commissioner Tony Zefiretto had sold the league to the ownership.

The league played its first season in 2022, while the Mississippi Raiders defeat the Las Vegas Kings 55–12 to claim Inaugural AIFA Championship.

Teams

Former teams
 Pennsylvania Union (Harrisburg, Pennsylvania) — Was part of the original teams joined from the AAL, but then was not included in 2022 alignment.
 St. Charles Bandits (St. Charles, Missouri) — Joined from the AAL for the 2022 season, but never played a game.

References 

Sports leagues established in 2022
2022 establishments in the United States
Indoor American football leagues in the United States
Professional sports leagues in the United States